Deep Creek is a  long tributary of the Great Salt Lake.

See also
List of rivers of Utah
List of rivers of Idaho
List of longest streams of Idaho

References

Rivers of Box Elder County, Utah
Rivers of Oneida County, Idaho
Rivers of Utah
Rivers of Idaho
Tributaries of the Great Salt Lake